Anthony Joseph Lynham (born 12 April 1960) is an Australian politician who was a Labor Party member of the Legislative Assembly of Queensland representing the electoral district of Stafford from 2014 to 2020. He was the Queensland Minister for Natural Resources, Mines and Energy. Lynham was an oral and maxillofacial surgeon.

Dental and Medical career
Lynham is a former maxillofacial surgeon who was a consultant surgeon at the Royal Brisbane and Women's Hospital. He also was a member of the hospital trauma team. He graduated in dentistry from University of Queensland and medicine from Newcastle University.  He holds a surgical fellowship from the Royal College of Surgeons Edinburgh in the general stream. Further training was completed in Switzerland.
One of his roles was the training of maxillofacial surgeons both at the college and hospital level. He is an active researcher and has published regularly. He is an associate professor at the University of Queensland and an adjunct professor at the Queensland University of Technology.

Political career
Lynham was first elected on 19 July 2014 at the Stafford by-election, which resulted from the resignation of former member Chris Davis, defeating the Liberal National candidate Bob Andersen with a 62 percent two-party vote from a 19-point two-party-preferred swing. Lynham then entered the Shadow Cabinet.

Palaszczuk government

On 16 February 2015, he was sworn in as Minister for State Development and Minister for Natural Resources and Mines in the Palaszczuk Ministry.

On 10 September 2020, Lynham announced he would retire from the Queensland Parliament and not contest the seat of Stafford in the 2020 election.

References

External links
Parliamentary biography
Queensland Labor candidate page
Official website

Queensland Maxillofacial Group

1960 births
Living people
Members of the Queensland Legislative Assembly
Australian maxillofacial surgeons
University of Newcastle (Australia) alumni
Fellows of the Royal College of Surgeons of Edinburgh
Academic staff of the University of Queensland
Australian Labor Party members of the Parliament of Queensland
Labor Right politicians
21st-century Australian politicians